AAHS may refer to:

Schools
 Academy of Allied Health & Science, a magnet public high school in Union County, New Jersey
 Air Academy High School, a public high school serving Colorado Springs, Colorado
 Aurora Alternative High School in Indiana
 Altoona Area High School, Pennsylvania

Other uses
 Radio AAHS, a long-standing radio station serving the Minneapolis – Saint Paul region
 American Aviation Historical Society